1ES 1101-232 is an active galactic nucleus of a distant galaxy known as a blazar.

An X-ray source (catalogued as A 1059-22) was first recorded by Maccagni and colleagues in a 1978 paper; they thought the source arose from a galaxy in the Abell 1146 galaxy cluster, which contained many giant elliptical galaxies. In 1989, Remillard and colleagues linked the X-ray source with a visual object and established that the object was surrounded by a large elliptical galaxy. They also discovered that the object (and galaxy) were more distant, with a redshift of 0.186. The host galaxy appears to be part of a distant galaxy cluster.

References

BL Lacertae objects
Crater (constellation)
Blazars